Jovan Pavlović (Sremski Karlovci, Habsburg Empire, 10 February 1843 –  Cetinje, Principality of Montenegro, 6 April 1892) was the founder of newspaper Pančevac in Pančevo in 1869, and Minister of Education in Montenegro, from 1885 to 1892.

He first studied jurisprudence at Belgrade's Grandes écoles in 1863, and continued his education in social sciences in Geneva and Munich, where he completed his studies in sociology.

Invited by Dr. Ljubomir Nenadović to head the staff of the newly-founded Commercial College in Pančevo, 25-year-old Jovan Pavlović, recent graduate of the University of Munich, arrived in mid-1868 with an ambition to assume the post of dean and launch a newspaper Pančevac. His career met with success despite the challenges of the time and place.

Sources
 Министар Јован Павловић, часопис: Босанска Вила, Сарајево, 10. 4. 1892. , pp. 160
 Јован Павловић, Министарство просвјете
 Јован Павловић Биографија

References 

 Adapted from Serbian Wikipedia:   https://sr.wikipedia.org/sr-ec/%D0%88%D0%BE%D0%B2%D0%B0%D0%BD_%D0%9F%D0%B0%D0%B2%D0%BB%D0%BE%D0%B2%D0%B8%D1%9B_(%D0%BC%D0%B8%D0%BD%D0%B8%D1%81%D1%82%D0%B0%D1%80)

1843 births
1892 deaths
Serbs of Montenegro
Montenegrin politicians